Agey is a commune in the Côte-d'Or department in the Bourgogne-Franche-Comté region of eastern France.

The inhabitants of the commune are known as Ageysiens or Ageysiennes

Geography
Agey is located some 20 km west of Dijon and 15 km east of Pouilly-en-Auxois. The A38 autoroute passes through the northern edge of the commune from east to west but has no exit. Access to the commune is via the D905 from Sombernon in the west which passes east parallel to and near the A38 continuing to Pont-de-Pany. From the D905 the D9G goes south to the village and continues south to Gissey-sur-Ouche. The D108 comes from Remilly-en-Montagne in the west through the heart of the commune and the village and continues east to Sainte-Marie-sur-Ouche. The commune is heavily forested in the south, north-east and to a lesser extent in the east. About 60% of the commune is farmland.

The Sirene river passes through the commune from west to east following a similar course to the D108 and joins the Ouche river just east of the commune.

Neighbouring communes and villages

Geology
"There are stones with fossil starfish preserved in limestone ash. When broken in two it reveals the relief of a part with five well-preserved arms. There is a type of stone called burgundy marble, composed essentially of oolites of an earthy gray colour with shells from stony corals as well as oolite marble of an earthy yellow with white dots and white lines due to portions of stone embedded with marine palm leaves and entroques"

History

According to Claude Courtépée the name comes from Ageya or Agia with the final form of the name being adopted in 1574. The village is located along two Roman roads. The Venus Vitrix was discovered by Dufour in 1924 and excavations were carried out under Mont Rond. A second Roman way was discovered between Châteauneuf and Malain. The discovery of the first Roman road was due to Father Chaume. It went from the Mountain of Veluze northwards towards Prâlon and Malain.

Jean Vivant Micault de Courbeton (10 May 1725 - 17 March 1794), President of the Parliament of Bourgogne, Lord of Agey, Barbirey-sur-Ouche, Fleurey-sur-Ouche, Meilly-sur-Rouvres, Maconge, Pommard, Santenay was executed by guillotine in the French Revolution.

Heraldry

Administration

List of Successive Mayors of Agey

Population

Culture and heritage

Civil heritage
The commune has many buildings and structures that are registered as historical monuments:

A Farmhouse (1) (18th century)
A House (1) (1774)
A Farmhouse (2) (1841)
A House (2) (19th century)
A Farmhouse (3) (1609)
A House (3) (19th century)
A Farmhouse (4) (18th century)
A House (4) (19th century)
A Farmhouse (5) (19th century)
A Farmhouse (6) (19th century)
A Farmhouse (7) (19th century)
A Farmhouse (8) (19th century)
The Town Hall (1845)
Houses and Farms (17th-19th century)
A Chateau (17th century)

There are three privately owned items in the commune which are registered as historical objects:
A Group Sculpture: Venus and love (3rd century)
A Chimney (18th century)
A Statuette: Saint Martha and the Tarasque (16th century)

The commune once had dry-stone huts called cabottes: their remains are found in old vineyard areas. They have been studied by Henri Dufour.

Religious heritage
The commune has several religious buildings and structures that are registered as historical monuments:
A Monumental Cross (1869)
A Monumental Cross (19th century)

The Parish Church of Saint Martin (19th century). The Church contains many items that are registered as historical objects:
A Statue: Saint Bernard (16th century)
A Statue: Saint Martin (16th century)
A Painting: the Charity of Saint Martin (19th century)
A Painting: Saint Michel bringing down the demon (17th century)
A Processional Cross (19th century)
A Processional Staff: Donation of the Rosary (17th century)
A Processional Staff: Saint Martin, of brotherhood (19th century)
7 Stained glass windows (19th century)
A Confessional (18th century)
A Pulpit (19th century)
A Statuette: Saint Catherine of Alexandria (18th century)
A Statuette: Virgin and child (18th century)
2 Statues: Saint Martin and Saint Bernard (16th century)
An Altar, Retable, and Tabernacle (2) (19th century)
An Altar, Retable, and Tabernacle (1) (19th century)

Notable People linked to the commune
Judith Jeanne-Agey (1593-1673), Abbess of the Abbey of Our Lady of the Assumption at Prâlon
Jean-Etienne Guettard (1715-1786), academician, stayed at the castle

See also
Communes of the Côte-d'Or department
French wine
Cantons of the Côte-d'Or department
Arrondissements of the Côte-d'Or department

Bibliography
Collective work, Agey and Environs Gazette, Ed. Agey Town Hall.

References

External links
Agey on the old IGN website 
Agey on Géoportail, National Geographic Institute (IGN) website 
Agey on the 1750 Cassini Map

Communes of Côte-d'Or